Virginia Joan Kennedy ( Bennett, born September 2, 1936) is an American socialite who was the first wife of U.S. Senator Ted Kennedy.

Early life 
Virginia Joan Bennett was born at Mother Cabrini Hospital in New York City. She was raised in a Roman Catholic family, in suburban Bronxville, New York. Her parents were Harry Wiggin Bennett Jr. (1907–1981), and Virginia Joan Stead (1911–1976). Her father was a graduate of Cornell University and later worked as an advertising executive. Bennett grew up with one younger sister, Candace "Candy," (born 1938). She attended Manhattanville College (then a Sacred Heart college), in Purchase, New York. Manhattanville was also the alma mater of her future mother-in-law, Rose Kennedy, as well as her future sisters-in-law Jean Kennedy Smith and Ethel Skakel Kennedy. In 1982, Bennett received an MA in Education from Lesley College, now known as Lesley University. As a teenager, she worked as a model in television advertising.

Marriage, family and divorce 

In October 1957, at the dedication of a gymnasium at Manhattanville College in memory of another Kennedy sister, Kathleen – who had died in a plane crash in France in 1948 – Jean Kennedy Smith introduced Joan to her younger brother Edward ( Ted), then a student at the University of Virginia School of Law in Charlottesville. The couple became engaged quickly and Joan grew nervous about marrying someone she did not know that well. Joe Kennedy insisted that the wedding should proceed, and they were married on November 29, 1958, in Bronxville, New York. The small family wedding was held just a few weeks after Ted's older brother U.S. Senator John F. Kennedy won his landslide re-election for his United States Senate seat representing Massachusetts in 1958. Joan had three children with Ted Kennedy: Kara Kennedy (1960–2011), Edward M. Kennedy Jr. (Ted Jr.) (b. 1961), and Patrick J. Kennedy (b. 1967).

Two of their children were cancer victims. Ted Jr. developed bone cancer at age 12, which resulted in the removal of a portion of his right leg in 1973, and Kara was treated for lung cancer in 2003. Daughter Kara Kennedy died of a heart attack at age 51 on September 16, 2011.

Ted suffered a severe back injury in a 1964 airplane crash, while campaigning for his first full Senate term. Joan assumed the full campaign-appearance schedule for his successful re-election in 1964. He had earlier won a special election in November 1962, to serve out the final two years of his brother John's Senate six-year term; John had resigned from the U.S. Senate upon his November 1960 election as the 35th U.S. President.

In July 1969, Ted Kennedy was involved in a car accident at a bridge on Chappaquiddick Island in Massachusetts that resulted in the death of his passenger, Mary Jo Kopechne. Although pregnant and confined to bed in the wake of two previous miscarriages, Joan attended Kopechne's funeral. Three days later, she stood beside her husband in a local court when he pleaded guilty to leaving the scene of an accident. She suffered a third miscarriage shortly thereafter.

The couple separated in 1978 after twenty years of marriage. She subsequently told McCall's magazine about her alcoholism and her work to stay sober. They remained together officially married during his failed 1980 U.S. presidential campaign, later announcing plans to divorce in 1981; the divorce was finalized in 1983.

Later life 
In 1992, she published the book The Joy of Classical Music: A Guide for You and Your Family. Kennedy has worked with children's charities, remains an accomplished pianist and has taught classical music to children.

Kennedy's later years have been shaped by chronic alcoholism, which had developed during her marriage. The alcohol problem escalated with sporadic, uneven sobriety, repeated drunk-driving arrests, court-ordered rehabilitation, and a return to drinking. This ultimately led to kidney damage, with the possibility of dialysis and protracted complications. In July 2004, her son, Ted Jr., had been appointed her legal guardian; in 2005, her children were granted temporary guardianship. That year, she was hospitalized with a concussion and a broken shoulder after being found lying in a Boston street near her home. In 2005, she requested that her second cousin, financial planner Webster E. Janssen of Connecticut, establish a trust to control her estate. This was in violation of her sons' guardianship. Her children later took successful legal action against Janssen, removing him as trustee and later filing a complaint against him with the U.S. Securities and Exchange Commission. That October, she was diagnosed with breast cancer and underwent surgery. She agreed to strict court-ordered guardianship and her estate has since been placed in a new trust overseen by two court-appointed trustees.

Apart from a brief relationship shortly after her divorce, she has neither remarried nor pursued another relationship. She attended Ted's funeral at the Kennedy compound in Hyannis Port. As of 2005, she resided in Boston, Massachusetts, and Cape Cod.

See also 
Kennedy family
 Kennedy family tree

Bibliography 
Kennedy, Joan Bennett (1992). The Joy of Classical Music: A Guide for You and Your Family. Nan A. Talese/Doubleday, New York. .

References

Further reading 
 Chellis, Marcia (1985). Living with the Kennedys: The Joan Kennedy Story. Simon & Schuster. .

External links 

1936 births
American socialites
Joan Bennett
Living people
Manhattanville College alumni
People from Barnstable, Massachusetts
Musicians from Boston
Spouses of Massachusetts politicians
Ted Kennedy
Writers from Massachusetts
Writers from the Bronx
Schools of the Sacred Heart alumni
Lesley University alumni
20th-century American pianists
Catholics from New York (state)
Catholics from Massachusetts
20th-century American women pianists